Modesti is an Italian surname. Notable people with the surname include:

Giuseppe Modesti (1915–1998), Italian opera singer
Maximo Modesti (born 1952), Argentine sport shooter
Nicola Modesti (born 1990), Italian footballer

See also
Modesto (surname)

Italian-language surnames